Price Glacier may refer to:

Price Glacier (Antarctica)
Price Glacier (Mount Shuksan), a glacier on Mount Shuksan, North Cascades National Park, USA